Ionești is a commune in Gorj County, Oltenia, Romania. It is composed of four villages: Gura Șușiței, Iliești, Ionești and Picu.

References

Communes in Gorj County
Localities in Oltenia